Južnjača uteha (trans. Southern Comfort) is the twelfth studio album from Serbian and former Yugoslav rock band Galija, released in 1999. The album features covers of Serbian traditional songs. The only song which is not a cover is the song "Uteha", written by Nenad Milosavljević and Dragutin Jakovljević.

Južnjačka uteha is one of two Galija albums (the other one being the 1998 live album Ja jesam odavde) recorded without vocalist Predrag Milosavljević.

Track listing
"Kaži kaži libe Stano" – 5:32
"Tikve" – 4:26
"Da znaješ mori mome" – 4:55
"Dimitrijo" – 5:18
"Uteha" - 5:02
"Igra kolo na livadi" – 5:34
"Smiljana" – 5:03
"Snošti si minav mamo" – 4:34
"Kalčina kafana" – 5:30

Personnel
Nenad Milosavljević - vocals, acoustic guitar, harmonica
Saša Ranđelović - guitar
Dragutin Jakovljević - guitar, synth guitar
Saša Lokner - keyboards
Slaviša Pavlović - bass guitar
Boban Pavlović - drums

Guest musicians
Marijana Popović - backing vocals (on "Tikve")

References 
 EX YU ROCK enciklopedija 1960-2006,  Janjatović Petar;  

Galija albums
1999 albums
PGP-RTS albums